Zadovite is an extremely rare mineral with formula BaCa6[(SiO4)(PO4)](PO4)2F. Together with  its vanadium-analogue, aradite, zadovite occur in paralavas (type of pyrometamorphic rocks). Both minerals have structures similar to nabimusaite, and these three minerals occur in the Hatrurim Formation of Israel. Structure of all three minerals is related to that of hatrurite. Minerals combining barium, phosphorus and silicon together are scarce.

References

Silicate minerals
Phosphate minerals
Calcium minerals
Barium minerals
Trigonal minerals
Minerals in space group 166